= Rhamphadoretus minutulus =

Scientific classification
- Kingdom: Animalia
- Phylum: Arthropoda
- Clade: Pancrustacea
- Class: Insecta
- Order: Coleoptera
- Suborder: Polyphaga
- Infraorder: Scarabaeiformia
- Family: Scarabaeidae
- Genus: Rhamphadoretus
- Species: R. minutulus

Binomial name
- Rhamphadoretus minutulus (Brenske, 1895)

Synonyms
- Adoretus minutulus Brenske, 1895

Species of beetle

Rhamphadoretus minutulus is a species of beetle of the family Scarabaeidae. It is found in north-eastern Africa, Ethiopia and Somalia.

== Description ==
Adults reach a length of about 6–6.5 mm (0.24–0.26 in). They are yellowish, with a darker head and a darker central area on the pronotum and along the suture. The third tooth of the front tibiae is set close and is very fine. The pronotum is coarsely and rather densely punctate and the elytra are punctate in almost regular rows, lacking distinct ridges, with the punctation becoming more irregular towards the suture. The pygidium is covered with somewhat longer hairs, and there is a marked size difference between the claws of the front legs.
